At the 1917 Far Eastern Championship Games, the athletics events were held in Tokyo, Japan in May. A total of eighteen events were contested in the men-only competition. The javelin throw was contested for the first time and a ten mile run was included for the first and only time as the sole long-distance running event (replacing the 8-mile race held in 1915). Japan won most of the individual track medals, while China and the Philippines were the most successful in the field events section.

Fortunato Catalon of the Philippines completed a sprint double in the 100-yard and 220-yard runs. Japan's Gishiro Taku completed a similar feat in the middle-distance running events. Filipino long jumper C. Cardenas was the only individual to retain their title from the 1915 Shanghai Championship Games. The decathlon winner Genzaburo Noguchi of Japan went on to become the first person to represent his country in the event at the 1920 Summer Olympics.

Medal summary

Men

References

Results
Far Eastern Championships. GBR Athletics. Retrieved on 2014-12-18.

1915
Far Eastern Championship Games
International athletics competitions hosted by Japan
1917 Far Eastern